The 2014 Grand Prix Hassan II is a professional tennis tournament played on clay courts. It is the 30th edition of the tournament, which is part of the 2014 ATP World Tour. It will take place in Casablanca, Morocco between 7 and 13 April 2014.

Singles main-draw entrants

Seeds 

 1 Rankings are as of March 31, 2014.

Other entrants 
The following players received wildcards into the singles main draw:
  Hicham Khaddari 
  Gaël Monfils
  Lamine Ouahab

The following players received entry from the qualifying draw:
 
  David Goffin
  Filip Peliwo
  Gilles Simon

The following player received entry as a Lucky loser:
  Andrey Kuznetsov

Withdrawals 
Before the tournament
  Pablo Andújar
  Roberto Bautista Agut
  Édouard Roger-Vasselin
  Gaël Monfils

Retirements
  Jiří Veselý (sickness)

Doubles main-draw entrants

Seeds 

 Rankings are as of March 31, 2014.

Other entrants 
The following pairs received wildcards into the doubles main draw:
  Ayoub Chakrouni /  Younès Rachidi
  Lamine Ouahab /  Mehdi Ziadi
The following pairs received entry as alternates:
  Carlos Berlocq /  Leonardo Mayer
  Martin Fischer /  Rogier Wassen

Withdrawals
Before the tournament
  Andre Begemann (left knee injury)
  Johan Brunström (wrist injury)

Champions

Singles 

  Guillermo García López def.  Marcel Granollers, 5–7, 6–4, 6–3

Doubles 

  Jean-Julien Rojer /  Horia Tecău def.  Tomasz Bednarek /  Lukáš Dlouhý, 6–2, 6–2

External links
 Official website